Luis Fernando Quintana Vega (born 3 February 1992) is a Mexican professional footballer who plays as a centre-back for Liga MX club Mazatlán.

In 2020, Quintana signed a two-year contract extension with Pumas UNAM.

References

External links
 

Living people
1992 births
Mexican footballers
Association football defenders
Club Universidad Nacional footballers
Liga MX players
Liga Premier de México players
Footballers from Mexico City